Hitch On The Leaves is the debut studio album by Australian dream pop band Gaslight Radio. Allmusic called the album "a wonderful debut album from this quintet, equal parts pretty Cocteau Twins-inspired shoegaze and fragile rock drive."

Track listing

References

1998 albums